The Lebanese Football Association (LFA) is the governing body of association football in Lebanon. Formed in 1933, it is a member of both the AFC and FIFA. It is also one of the founding members of the WAFF, joining in its inception in 2001.

History
In 1931 Khalil Hilmi, a member of Riyadi Beirut, attempted to form a federation. However, the proposal failed as Nahda opposed its formation. On 22 March 1933, representatives of thirteen football clubs gathered in the Minet El Hosn district in Beirut to form the Lebanese Football Association (LFA). Hussein Sejaan was the LFA's first president. Lebanon was one of the first nations in the Middle East to establish an administrative body for association football. The LFA joined FIFA in 1936 and the AFC in 1964. In 2001, the LFA joined the WAFF as one of its founding members.

In 1985, in the midst of the Lebanese Civil War, the LFA was divided into two administrations: Western, headed by Nabil Al Raei, and Eastern, headed by Hamid Khoury. FIFA froze Lebanon's membership until 5 February 1987, when FIFA president Sepp Blatter sent a telex letter to the LFA recognizing the elections of 2 May 1985, which had elected Al Raei as the LFA president.

Principals

Board of directors

See also
Lebanese Premier League
Lebanese FA Cup
Lebanon national football team
2013 Lebanese match fixing scandal

Notes

References

Bibliography

External links
 
 Lebanon at FIFA.com
 Lebanon at the-AFC.com
 Lebanon at the-WAFF.com

 
1933 establishments in Lebanon
 
Futsal in Lebanon
Sports organizations established in 1933
Football
Lebanon